The Roman Catholic Archdiocese of Teresina is an archdiocese located in the city of Teresina in Brazil.

History
 20 February 1902: Established as Diocese of Piaui from the Diocese of São Luís do Maranhão
 16 December 1944: Renamed as Diocese of Teresina
 9 August 1952: Promoted as Metropolitan Archdiocese of Teresina

Bishops
 Bishops of Piaui 
 Joaquim Antônio d’Almeida (1905.12.14 – 1910.10.23)
 Quintino Rodrigues de Oliveira e Silva (2013.02.17, did not take effect)
 Octaviano Pereira de Albuquerque (1914.04.02 – 1922.10.27), appointed Archbishop of São Luís do Maranhão 
 Severino Vieira de Melo (1923.06.08 – 1944.12.16)
 Bishops of Teresina 
 Severino Vieira de Melo (1944.12.16 – 1952.08.09)
 Archbishops of Teresina
 Severino Vieira de Melo (1952.08.09 – 1955.05.27)
 Avelar Brandão Vilela (1955.11.05 – 1971.03.25), appointed Archbishop of São Salvador da Bahia (Cardinal in 1973)
 José Freire Falcão (1971.11.25 – 1984.02.15), appointed Archbishop of Brasília, Distrito Federal (Cardinal in 1988)
 Miguel Fenelon Câmara Filho (1984.10.07 – 2001.02.21)
 Celso José Pinto da Silva (2001.02.21 – 2008.09.03)
 Sérgio da Rocha (2008.09.03 – 15 June 2011), appointed Archbishop of Brasília, Distrito Federal (Cardinal in 2016)
 Jacinto Furtado de Brito Sobrinho (22 February 2012 – 4 January 2023)
 Juarez Sousa da Silva (4 January 2023 – present)

Coadjutor bishops
Sérgio da Rocha (2007-2008); future Cardinal

Auxiliary bishops
Raimundo de Castro e Silva (1950-1954), appointed Bishop of Oeiras
José Gonzalez Alonso (1994-2001), appointed Bishop of Cajazeiras, Paraiba

Other priests of this diocese who became bishop
Júlio César Souza de Jesus, appointed Auxiliary Bishop of Fortaleza, Ceara in 2018

Suffragan dioceses
 Diocese of Bom Jesus do Gurguéia 
 Diocese of Campo Maior
 Diocese of Floriano
 Diocese of Oeiras
 Diocese of Parnaíba
 Diocese of Picos
 Diocese of São Raimundo Nonato

References
 

 Additional sources 

 GCatholic.org
 Catholic Hierarchy
  Archdiocese website (Portuguese)

Roman Catholic dioceses in Brazil
Roman Catholic ecclesiastical provinces in Brazil
 
Christian organizations established in 1902
Roman Catholic dioceses and prelatures established in the 20th century